Forbidden Journey was a 1950 political thriller film situated in post-World War II Canada. A communist spy (Jan Rubeš) attempts to pass information to his uncle in Canada while spies try to hunt him down. It starred Jan Rubeš and his future wife Susan Douglas. The film premiered at the Princess Theater in Montreal, Quebec, Canada on September 22, 1950. The release did not sell well and had mixed reviews. It was criticized for insufficient excitement, weak villains and a poor plot and sound.

References

External links
 

1950 films
1950s thriller films
Canadian black-and-white films
Canadian spy films
Canadian thriller films
Cold War spy films
English-language Canadian films
1950s English-language films
1950s Canadian films